Science and Technology is a faculty at Aarhus University. Science and Technology offers sixteen BSc degree programmes, eight BEng degree programmes (Professional bachelor's degrees) and twenty-eight MSc degree programmes, nine of which are MEng degree programmes. ST also offers a small number of further and continuing education programmes. Niels Chr. Nielsen is the dean of Science and Technology.

The teaching is organised in three schools: the Aarhus School of Science (ASOS) for the science degree programmes, the Aarhus University School of Engineering (ASE) for the engineering degree programmes, and the Graduate School of Science and Technology (GSST) for the PhD degree programmes.

The faculty consists of twelve departments, three schools, a major interdisciplinary centre (iNANO), a number of larger and smaller centres, and two national centres (DCA – Danish Centre for Food and Agriculture and DCE – Danish Centre for Environment and Energy).

Science and Technology was established on 1 January 2011 by amalgamating the former Faculty of Science, Faculty of Agricultural Sciences and National Environmental Research Institute of Denmark (NERI).

As of 1 January 2012, ST also merged with the Engineering College of Aarhus, which is now a school under Science and Technology responsible for study programmes and educational activities for the BEng and MEng degrees.

Science and Technology is also responsible for four of the university’s museums, with 80,000 visitors annually.

Departments and centers at Science and Technology, Aarhus University 
 Department of Agroecology
 Department of Bioscience
 Department of Computer Science
 Department of Physics and Astronomy
 Department of Food Science
 Department of Geoscience
 Department of Animal Science
 Department of Engineering
 Department of Chemistry
 Department of Mathematics
 Department of Environmental Science
 Department of Molecular Biology and Genetics
 Aarhus University School of Engineering
 DCA - Danish Centre for Food and Agriculture
 DCE - Danish Centre for Environment and Energy
 iNANO - Interdisciplinary Nanoscience Center 
 Bioinformatics Research Center, BIRC
 Centre for Carbohydrate Recognition and Signalling
 Centre for Catalysis
 Centre for DNA Nanotechnology, CDNA
 Centre for Insoluble Protein Structures, 
 Centre for Massive Data Algorithmics, MADALGO
 Centre for mRNP Biogenesis and Metabolism
 Centre for Oxygen Microscopy and Imaging, COMI
 Centre for Pervasive Computing
 Centre for Quantum geometry of Moduli Spaces, QGM
 Centre for Science Education, CSE
 Centre for Scientific Computing Aarhus, CSC-AA
 Centre for Structural Biology
 Centre for Theoretical Chemistry, LCTC
 Centre for Theory in Natural Science, CTN
 Centre for the Topology and Quantization of Moduli Spaces, CTQM
 Centre for AMS 14C Dating
 Centre for Applied Sciences, CTK
 Centre for Tropical Ecosystems Research, 
 Danish Centre for Molecular Gerontology
 Danish Centre for Transgenic Mice
 Danish Quantum Optics Center, QUANTOP Department of ChemistryDepartment of Earth Sciences Department of Molecular BiologyDepartment of Sport Science Foundations in Cryptology and Security, FICS
 Institute for Storage Ring Facilities Aarhus, ISA
 Instrument Centre for CERN, ICE
 Instrument Centre for Solid-State NMR Spectroscopy
 Interdisciplinary Nanoscience Center, 
 Nordic Laboratory for Luminescence dating, NLL
 PUMKIN - Membrane pumps in cells and disease
 Quantum Mechanics for Large Molecular Systems
 Stellar Astrophysics Center
 Theoretical Centre for Quantum System Research, LCT
 The T.N. Thiele Centre for Applied Mathematics in Natural Science

External links 
Aarhus University
National Environmental Research Institute, Aarhus University

Aarhus University
Public universities